House of Darkness is a 1948 British film. It was directed by Oswald Mitchell.

It marked the film debut of Laurence Harvey.

Plot
A young man plans to get his hands on the family fortune.

Production
Harvey had been spotted by a talent scout while performing in Manchester Rep.

Cast
Henry Oscar as Film Director
Laurence Harvey as Francis (as Lawrence Harvey)
Lesley Osmond as Elaine
Alexander Archdale as John
John Teed as Noel
Grace Arnold as Tessa
Pauline Winter as Maid
Charles Paton as Solicitor's Clerk
John Stuart as Crabtree
Sidney Monckton as Dr. Graham
Lesley Brook as Lucy
George Melachrino as Conductor of Orchestra

References

External links
House of Darkness at IMDb
House of Darkness at BFI
House of Darkness at Letterbox DVD
House of Darkness at BBFC

1948 films
British horror films
1948 horror films
British black-and-white films
Films directed by Oswald Mitchell
1940s British films